Nitesh Kumar (born 12 August 1997) is an Indian kabaddi player who currently plays for U.P. Yoddha in VIVO Pro Kabaddi league. Kumar is a Future Kabaddi Heroes programme graduate and was picked up by U.P. Yoddha in the Season 5 auction. In VIVO Pro Kabaddi Season 6, Kumar became the first player in league history to score 100 tackle points in a single campaign.

Early life 
Nitesh pursued a career in kabaddi since a young age and was encouraged to do so by his father, who was also a kabaddi player and played in the Cover position.

Career

Season 5 
Nitesh Kumar made his debut in UP Yoddha’s season opener against the Telugu Titans in Hyderabad and had the perfect start to his VIVO Pro Kabaddi career, scoring a High 5 in just five tackle attempts in his team’s 31-18 victory. He featured 19 times in the season and scored 47 tackle points with four High 5s.

Season 6 
The right corner started the season well, scoring 20 tackle points in U.P. Yoddha’s first seven matches, however, the team managed just three wins through that spell. The next nine games yielded no wins for the Yoddha, but Nitesh continued to shine and scored 40 tackle points over that period to keep himself in contention for the Best Defender award. In their final six games of the campaign, Yoddha won five and tied one, and Nitesh was yet again the star, scoring 25 tackle points to help his team earn an unlikely Playoffs berth. In Eliminator 1 against U Mumba, Nitesh produced a defensive masterclass, scoring eight tackle points as the Yoddha upset U Mumba 34-29 to move on to Eliminator 3 against Dabang Delhi The right corner added three more tackle points to his season tally in his team’s 45-33 victory. In Qualifier 2 against the Gujarat Fortunegiants, Nitesh scored six tackle points to bring his season tally to 100 tackle points, as his team lost 38-31, ending their season.

Records and achievements

 Best Defender (2018)

References 

1997 births
Living people
Indian kabaddi players
Pro Kabaddi League players